The Runner is a 1999 crime thriller film directed by Ron Moler and starring Ron Eldard and Courteney Cox.

The soundtrack contains songs performed by Nick Cave and the Bad Seeds and Douglas September.

Synopsis 
In the film, a young man (Ron Eldard) with a gambling addiction has managed to get himself into serious debt by losing all his money. In an effort to pay off the bookies, his uncle pulls a few strings and gets him a job working for a gangster named Deepthroat  (played by John Goodman), who needs a "runner" to place bets with various bookies. The gangster keeps his new "runner" on a short leash and, for the most part, the young gambler behaves himself. However, the temptation of walking around with large sums of cash proves too great, and the "runner" puts both his job and his survival on the line when he dips into his boss' funds to buy a ring for his girlfriend, played by Cox.

Cast
Ron Eldard as Edward
Courteney Cox as Karina
John Goodman as Deepthroat
Joe Mantegna as Rocco
Bokeem Woodbine as 477
Terrence Evans as Lefty

Production 
The Runner was initially intended to be a large budget that would serve as Moler's directorial debut. While Zuiker was shopping the script around a production company offered to fund the film if Moler stepped down as director. This offer was refused and The Runner was filmed as an independent film.

Release 
The Runner was released direct to video in 1999.

Reception 
The film received reviews from The Boston Globe and Variety.

References

External links
 
 

1999 films
1999 crime thriller films
Films scored by Anthony Marinelli
American crime thriller films
1990s English-language films
1990s American films